Laurenz Janscha, originally Lovro Janša (30 June 1749, Bresnitz - 1 April 1812, Vienna) was a Slovenian-born Austrian landscape painter and engraver.

Life and work 
He was born to a farmer, Matija Janša (1683–1752), and his wife Lucia, née Debellak (1705–1781). Around 1770, he was accepted as a student at a copper engraving school in Vienna, where he was trained in landscape drawing by Johann Christian Brand. Later, he studied with Franz Edmund Weirotter. After 1780, he also worked with etching.

In 1785, he worked for the Viennese publishing company, Artaria; producing seven watercolors for their Collection de 50 vues de la ville de Vienne. As a result, he came to focus on producing vedute of Vienna and its surroundings, many of which were engraved by Johann Ziegler. He created a massive panorama of the city in 1803. It was initially shown at the Wurstelprater, then toured to several cities.

In 1797, he had succeeded  as the teacher of landscape drawing at the Academy of Fine Arts. In 1806, following the death of Friedrich August Brand, he was appointed head of the Master Class. He was named a Professor in 1811.

His eldest brother, Anton, started out as a painter, but gave it up to become a beekeeper, and was a pioneer of modern apiculture.

Sources
 Peter Pötschner, "Janscha, Laurenz" in: Neue Deutsche Biographie 10 (1974), pp. 339 f. (Online)
 Stefan Grathoff, Laurenz Janscha @ the Institut für Geschichtliche Landeskunde, University of Mainz
 Biography from the Biographisches Lexikon des Kaiserthums Oesterreich @ WikiSource

External links 

 Biography @ the Wien Geschichte Wiki

1749 births
1812 deaths
Slovenian painters
Austrian painters
Austrian landscape painters
Austrian engravers
Academic staff of the Academy of Fine Arts Vienna
People from Žirovnica, Žirovnica